The muaythai tournaments at the 2017 World Games in Wrocław, Poland was held from 28 to 30 July 2017 at the Orbita Hall. It was the first time of muaythai including in the World Games. 87 Muay Thai practitioners from 37 NOCs were featured competing in eleven weight categories; four eight men, and three for women.

Competition schedule
All times are in local time (UTC+2), according to the official schedule. This schedule may be subject to change in due time.

Participating nations
The following National Olympic Committees earned spots to compete, with the number of athletes in parentheses. 87 athletes from 37 NOCs are expected to participate. Poland was the only delegation to qualify the maximum number of entries (11 athletes total).

Medal summary

Medal table

Men

Women

Notes

References

External links
 The World Games 2017
 Result Book

2017 World Games
 
2017
2017 in Muay Thai
Muay Thai competitions in Poland